Crooked X is the first and only album by heavy metal band Crooked X, released in January 2009 by Capitol Metal. The band's musicians were all 14 years of age when the album was released, but tracks were written when members were as young as 11 (for example, "Nightmare"). "Nightmare" is featured in the music video game Rock Band, while "Gone" and "Rock 'N' Roll Dream" are featured as downloadable content for the Rock Band series.

Track listing

Credits

Band
Boomer Simpson - Drums, Backing Vocals
Forrest French - Lead Vocals, Guitar
Jesse Cooper - Guitar, Backing Vocals
Josh McDowell - Bass

References

2009 debut albums